France has been invaded on numerous occasions, by foreign powers or rival French governments; there have also been unimplemented invasion plans.
 the 1746 War of the Austrian Succession, Austria-Italian forces supported by the British navy attempted to invade southern France
 the French Revolutionary Wars invasion attempts to defeat the French Revolution
 the 1794 Flanders Campaign, led by Britain and Austria
 the 1795 Battle of Quiberon, led by a British-backed force of French Emigres
 the 1813 War of the Sixth Coalition, a British-led coalition invaded Napoleon's France to the south while a multi-national coalition attacked from the north
 the 1815 Hundred Days, the Seventh Coalition invaded France following the Battle of Waterloo
 the 1870 Franco-Prussian War, Prussian forces invaded France due to tensions regarding Prussia's growing influence in central Europe
 the 1905 Schlieffen Plan, the German Empire's strategic plan for victory in a two-front war against France and Russia
 the 1914 Battle of the Marne, the actual implementation of the previous plan at the outset of World War I
 the World War II invasions
 the May 1940 Battle of France, started by Nazi Germany's invasion of the Ardennes and the Low countries
 the June 1944 Operation Overlord, the Allied invasion of Normandy
 the August 1944 Operation Dragoon, the Allied invasion of the south of France

See also
 List of wars involving France
 :Category:Invasions by France

France, invasions
Invasions